Goelet is a surname, and may refer to:

Mary Goelet (1878-1937), Duchess of Roxburghe
Ogden Goelet (1851–1897), real estate developer
Peter Goelet (1727–1811), American merchant and real estate developer
Peter P. Goelet (1764–1828), his son, American merchant and real estate developer
Robert Goelet Sr. (1809–1879), his son, real estate developer
Robert Goelet (1841–1899), his son, real estate developer
Robert Walton Goelet (1880–1941), his son, real estate developer
Robert Wilson Goelet (1880–1966), American social leader, banker, and real estate developer, son of Ogden Goelet

See also
Goelet family
George Goelet Kip (1845–1926), American lawyer
Peter Goelet Gerry (1879–1957), American lawyer and politician
Goelet Building (disambiguation) in New York City